Bir Singha Dev, also known as Beera Singha was the fifty-second king of the Mallabhum. He ruled from 1656 to 1682 CE.

History

Personal life
Bir Singha Dev was the son of Raghunath Singha Dev. During his regime his kingdom was extended. It was the period when Aurangjeb was the Samrat. History says that Auranjeb was a very cruel type of king. He seized all the tax-free land or bepanchaki jamin from them. Bir Singha Dev had two queens. The elder one Churamoni or Siromoni Devi was a very pious woman. She had three sons named Durjan, Sur, and Krishna Singha 0ev. The younger queens name was Swamamoyee Devi. She was a very cruel woman and had one son. As she thought that her son would not be able to sit on the throne of the Malla king, she insisted Bir Singha to kill all the sons of his first wife and the king also had done the cruel murder of his sons of first wife as per the instruction of the second wife. Among those three sons by his first wife Durjan Singha Dev somehow escaped and could save his life. 
Later the second wife's only son Baldev died. Then Bir Singha Dev could realize what wrong he had done. He became very disturbed, disappointed and repented. He was in search of his successor. At that time Durjan Singha Dev came to him. The king did not know that he was alive. Seeing him Bir Singha Dev got some peace in his mind and Durjan Singha Dev became the king after Bir Singha Dev.

Reservoir
He also Had the seven big lakes or tanks, called Lalbandh, Krishnabandh, Gantatbandh, Jamunabandh, Kalindibandh, Shyambandh, and pokabandh excavated, and erected.

Mallabhum temples
Though Bir Singha Dev was cruel, but he had an aesthetic sense and during his period several temples were established which are full with artistic work. As per the wishes of the queen Siromoni Devi, two buildings were also constructed and dedicated to Radha Krishna. Those are Madan Mohan and Madan Gopal temple In Bishnupur, he established both small and large stone gates, Radha lal Jiu temple.

Radha Laljiu/Laljiu temple
After crossing the big stone gate if one stands facing south, one can see the palace and on the north or left side there are several temples. Among those, a laterite temple is found. Bir Singha Dev established it in 1658. In its architecture Orissa style is noticed. There are figures of birds and animals with fresco painting. The temple is placed upon a large plinth. It is a square shaped temple with slanting roof slightly sloping in all sides. It has a nahabat khana (room or platform where the sanai concert is played), nat mandir (portico of a temple) that reminds the visitors, tourists and travelers about the recreational life of the Malla dynasty. In the temple) deity is there and everyday puja is performed officiated by a Brahman.

Murali Mohan temple
This magnificent temple was built by Siromani Chudamoni Devi, the queen of Raja Bir Singha Dev and mother of Durjan Singha Dev in 1665. This latente ekratna temple is dedicated to Murali Mohan Jiu. A few decorations of floral designs is noticed. Stuccowork is found in this temple.

Image gallery

References

Sources
 

Malla rulers
Kings of Mallabhum
17th-century Indian monarchs
Mallabhum